"One Kind of Love" is a song written by Brian Wilson and Scott Bennett, released as the eleventh track on Wilson's eleventh studio album No Pier Pressure on April 7, 2015. A music video debuted online two months later in June. It is one of the few songs on the album which does not give a writing credit to Joe Thomas.

The song was written for Bill Pohlad's film Love & Mercy and appears on its accompanying soundtrack.

Critical reception
The Telegraph drew comparisons between it and the french horn in "God Only Knows". In a review that called No Pier Pressure "inessential listening", the New York Observer wrote that "One Kind of Love" was evidence that "Wilson can still throw one hell of a melody out there."

Accolades

References

2010s ballads
2015 songs
Brian Wilson songs
Pop ballads
Song recordings produced by Brian Wilson
Songs written by Brian Wilson
Songs written for films